James A. Boon is a professor of anthropology at Princeton University.

References

External links
James A. Boon's homepage at Princeton

20th-century births
Princeton University faculty
American anthropologists
University of Chicago alumni
Living people